Henri Høeg (born 26 June 1954) is a Danish weightlifter. He competed in the men's middle heavyweight event at the 1984 Summer Olympics.

References

1954 births
Living people
Danish male weightlifters
Olympic weightlifters of Denmark
Weightlifters at the 1984 Summer Olympics
Sportspeople from Aarhus